A list of animated television series first aired in 1974.

See also
 List of animated feature films of 1974
 List of Japanese animation television series of 1974

References

Television series
Animated series
1974
1974
1974-related lists